Club Deportes Recoleta is an association football club of Chile of the commune of Recoleta, situated in the town of Santiago. It was the champion of the Tercera División B in 2015 and the champion of the Segunda Division of Chile in 2021 playing now in the Primera B, the second level of Chilean football.

History
The Corporación Municipal de Deportes de Recoleta through its mayor, Daniel Jadue, raises the interest of framing and develop a structural program it will be mainly the conformation of a sports club football of amateur nature that compete in the Tercera División B of the Championship ANFA, And that it develops under certain selective parameters that will generate a new organizational array in regard to the process of recruitment and training of future values that they perform in the sporting activity.

Official debut
The club it was accepted to play the Tercera División B of Chile in the year 2014, the same year of its creation, in his first official match, falls defeated 1-0 to Quintero Unido, the first official victory of the recoletanos would come in the date 3, by beating him as a visitor 4-2 to another team that he debuted at the tournament, as it was Ferro Lampa. And your first triumph as local, was performed on the date 4, in the Estadio Municipal de Recoleta, before the historic Ferroviarios, defeating them 2-1. In that tournament the club ended in the second place of the North Zone with 38 points, one less than the pointer, classifying the second phase. Despite all predictions, ended up being deleted, after falling before Real San Joaquin in the last date, plus another result that the left outside the playoff by the promotion, only by goal difference.

Absolute Cup 2015
The year 2015 kept the good campaign, in the Copa Absoluta of Tercera División, where debuted in Tercera División A, front of the cast of Provincial Marga Marga in Quilpué where defeated them by 5-2. Finally they would remain in the second location behind Union Casablanca in the group 8, and would happen to the eighth-finals, where would confront to Deportes Vallenar.
After a tie in the Gone by 1-1 in the Estadio Chacabuco and the tie 2-2 in the turn in the Estadio Nelson Rojas of Vallenar, the Albiazules classified by goals of visit to quarter-finals, to which arrived only two clubs of the Tercera División B that still litigated the promotion, Deportes Recoleta and Lautaro de Buin. For this phase, the Recoletanos would go back to equalise now in front of Union Casablanca 1-1 in the Estadio Chacabuco, but would fall in the duel of turn 1-0 in the Estadio Arturo Echazarreta with which would remain deleted and would lose the promotion, That would finish in hands of Lautaro de Buin the one who to the dessert classified to Semifinals after winning to Deportivo Estación Central.

First Title
Deportes Recoleta had his rematch for the official championship. It kept  like leader 18 of the 22 dates of the first phase, obtaining 20 parties won, 1 tie and 1 defeat, for the final phase the Recoletanos split winning by 2-1 to Provincial Osorno in the Estadio Rubén Marcos Peralta, Although they were defeated by Athletic Club Colina, the albiazules attained to surpass and remained  widely with the playoff, five points on the second, that to the dessert would be the same Provincial Osorno, what would close a year with a performance that kept it in command of the Tercera División B by almost all the championship and attaining the longed for promotion to the Tercera División A of Chile like champion.

Absolute Cup 2016
The team of Recoleta came to the Copa Absoluta being the champion of the Tercera División B. had the poster of favorite to stay with the Group 7, where it was located. Surprisingly the club is eliminated in the first phase, leaving in third place of 5 teams, with 6 points.

Debut in Tercera A and ascent to professionalism 
The official tournament from Tercera División A 2016 began with defeat for the albiazules, 1-2 compared with the historical club General Velásquez. After that, the set managed to build a solid base, arriving to be consolidated during the following meetings, the club maintained a correct performance, without peel never of the first places.

Deportes Recoleta  of the hand of his coach, Fabián Marzuca, was leading from the date 14, consolidating its position as one of the candidates for the ascent. Finally, on 3 December 2016, the albiazules defeated Lautaro de Buin, by date 28, by 2-0, sealing its second consecutive ascent, and step, a milestone for the club: for the first time in its short history, would play in professional football Chilean.

Team colours
Uniform
 Home uniform: white jersey with blue details,  blue shorts, blue socks.
 Away uniform: blue jersey with white details, white shorts, white socks.

Shirt sponsors
List of Kit Manufacturers
  Training Professional (2014–Present)

List of Shirt Sponsors
  Vega Central (2014–Present)

Seasons played
2 season in Primera B 
5 season in Segunda División 
1 season in Tercera División A 
2 seasons in Tercera División B

Honours

Squad
.

Managers

  Fabián Marzuca (2014-2019)
  Felipe Núñez (2020-Present)

References

External links
 Official website

See also
Chilean football league system

Deportes Recoleta
Football clubs in Chile
Association football clubs established in 2014
Sport in Santiago
2014 establishments in Chile
Recoleta, Chile